This is a list of civil parishes in the ceremonial county of Rutland, England.

As of 2019 there are 57 parishes in the county, the whole county is parished. The most recent change to their number was in 2016, with the merger of Exton and Horn.

Population figures are unavailable for some of the smallest parishes.

See also
 List of civil parishes in England

References

External links
 Office for National Statistics : Geographical Area Listings

 
Rutland
Populated places in Rutland
Parishes